Musotima tanzawensis is a moth in the family Crambidae. It was described by Yoshiyasu in 1985. It is found in Japan (Shikoku).

References

Moths described in 1985
Musotiminae